Songanella is an extinct genus of prehistoric bony fish that lived during the early Tithonian stage of the Late Jurassic epoch.

See also

 Prehistoric fish
 List of prehistoric bony fish

References

Late Jurassic fish
Palaeonisciformes